Charis Costopoulos (born 16 March 1964) is a Greek singer, songwriter, poet, composer He started his career in 1975, at the age of 11, playing bouzuki. His albums were released on labels such as RCA Records, Virus Music and Heaven Music. His 1998 song "Σε θυμάμαι" was covered by Aca Lukas (as "Koma") and became a major hit.

Personal life
Kostopoulos is married and has two sons.

Discography
1987 – Ας Ξεχαστώ
1990 – Πειρατικά 
1991 – Τελευταία Προσφορά Μου
1993 – Παραμιλάω
1994 – Μια Βραδιά Με Το Χάρη
1995 – Υποχρέωση
1996 – Γεμάτα Φεγγάρια
1998 – Με Ξεχνάς
1999 – Καζίνο
2000 – Εδώ Σε Θέλω
2002 – Ήρθε Ο Καιρός
2002 – Live 2002
2003 – Αμαρτίες
2005 – Δυο Ξένοι
2006 – Είσαι Μια Θεά
2006 – Χαρτιά Σημαδεμένα
2007 – 34 Ψυχεδελικά Τσιφτετέλια
2007 – Όλο Χωρίζω Kι Όλο Γυρίζω 
2008 – Είσαι Κατάλληλη
2009 – Πρώτο Θέμα
2010 – Live (2Cd's)
2011 – Και Παρασύρθηκα
2012 – Έχω Γεννηθεί Ωραίος
2013 – Παραπάτησα
2014 – Συνωμότησε Η Φύση
2014 – Φέρτε Τα Ποτά
2014 – Ψυχασθενής
2015 – Η Καταστροφή Μου
2015 – Είναι Να Μην Βάλω Κάτι Στο Μυαλό Μου
2016 – Πως Να Σε Ξεπεράσω
2016 – Κύκλους Κάνει
2016 – Το Διασκεδάζω
2016 – Φήμες
2017 – Χάρης Κωστόπουλος – Live
2017 – Θα Παρεκτραπώ
2017 – Έχω Περάσει Από Φωτιές
2017 – Τα Καλύτερα Συστατικά
2018 – Θα Χορέψει Όλη Η Ελλάδα
2018 – Καίω τη νύχτα
2019 – Πίνω Και Γυρίζουν Όλα
2019 - Για Να Ξέρεις

References

Living people
1964 births
20th-century Greek male singers
21st-century Greek male singers
People from Aridaia